Nena Lekovic is a famous Serbian songwriter who has had a large presence in the Eastern European pop music scene, collaborating with several famous pop stars.

Biography

Nena Lekovic was born in Zaječar, Serbia, and started a musical journey at Mokranjac Music School, not realising that this journey would take her to become a renowned composer and songwriter being sought after by the top pop stars of Serbia. She finished her studies at the Faculty of Music Arts in Belgrade. Lekovic started her career as a professor at the Josip Slavenski music school.

Lekovic's first success and international recognition as a composer and songwriter, came in 1988. She began collaborating with the most important vocal soloists in entertainment, pop and folk music (including Nataša Bekvalac, Biljana Jeftić, Marija Šerifović, Zorica Brunclik, Toše Proeski, Ogi Radivojević, Maja Odžaklijevska, Koktel bend, Goca Tržan, Slavko Banjac, Jellena, Sanja Đorđević, Aleksandra Perović, Cakana, Ekstra Nena, Merima Njegomir) as well as children's choirs and soloists (Kolibri Choir and Carolija).

She has also collected several awards along the way, such as the Award for Mediterranean Sound at the Budva Music Festival 2007 for the song "Ključ od ljubavi". One of her songs, “Otrezni me” was also one of the nominations to represent Serbia and Montenegro at the Eurovision 2006. Lekovic is known for bringing a unique style, and even able to transform more traditional folk music to straddle the line of pop in a successful way, like done with the album “Farmi” of celebrated singer of folk music, Dragica Radosavljevic Cakana's  Her successes led to her being selected as a Member of the Board of Serbian music copyright agency, SOKOJ.

She has done some collaborations with her husband, Zoran Lekovic, a famous Yugoslav pop singer who also is well known as a producer,  author of lyrics,  and actor in several top end theatre musicals. She has two children, both very immersed in the creative scene; Maya Lekovic, a singer, composer and producer who composed for pop stars, selling her first song at the age of thirteen. She now works in Amsterdam, Netherlands as the owner of her own Music Production Agency, writing music for film and ad, and music for pop. And Nemanja Lekovic who acted as Gavroche in Les Misérables and now studies TV and Film Production at the Faculty of Dramatic Arts, Belgrade.

Discography

Writing and Arrangement (a selection) 
 1990 Dušan Kostic - Kad Bi Mi Rekla PGP RTB
 1992 Extra Nena - Nije Za Tebe Žar PGP RTB
 1994 Dragica Radosavljevic Cakana, Orkestar Gorana Mitica - Puklo Srce PGP RTS
 1994 Jasmina Cirovic - Smej Se Nocas PGP RTS
 1995 Various - Probudi Se Andele PGP RTS
 1995 Neša Lutovac - Srce Lupa PGP RTS
 1995 Sanja Ðordevic - Tugo ZaM
 1996 Dragica Radosavljevic Cakana - Sibirski Vetrovi PGP RTS
 1998 Dragica Radosavljevic Cakana - Ružo Moja PGP RTS
 1998 Zorica Brunclik - Zemlja Iz Moga Sna PGP RTS
 2000 Dragica Radosavljevic Cakana - Hej, I Ja Imam Dušu Grand Production
 2000 Various - Sve Košava
 2001 Various - Nece Grom Grand Production
 2001 Jellena - Ljudi Smo City Records
 2001 Jellena - Hej Stani Dušo City Records
 2001 Various - Nisam Ja Bez Prošlosti CentroScena
 2001 Nataša Bekvalac - Zar S' Njom City Records
 2002 Koktel Bend - Zlocin City Records
 2002 Various - Za Dodir Tvojih Usana PGP RTS
 2003 Jellena - Za Dodir Tvojih Usana City Records
 2003 Zorana - Bez Brige City Records
 2003 Various - Kraljica Poroka Music Star Production
 2004 Various - Tvoje Oci Žive PGP RTS
 2004 Suzana Mancic - Suze Kamene Grand Production
 2005 Various - Ne Verujem Ti S Muzika, Radio S
 2006 Jasna Ðokic - Moje Usne Su Melem Za Telo PGP RTS
 2006 Various - Otrezni Me PGP RTS
 2006 Ogi Radivojević - Žig Do Žiga PGP RTS
 2006 Marija Šerifovic - Na Tvojoj Košulji City Records
 2007 Toše Proeski - Najlepše Moje City Records
 2007 Alexandra Perovic* - Opium City Records
 2008 Goca Tržan - Hotel City Records
 2008 Zorana - Bez Brige City Records
 2009 Toše - Najljepše Moje City Records
 2010 Platinum Collection  - '' City Records
 2010 Dragica Radosavljevic Cakana - Kunem Se Grand Production
 2014 Miki Peric - Najmanje Si Moja Bila Ti'' Multimedia Music

References

Living people
Serbian composers
Serbian songwriters
Serbian women artists
Women composers
People from Zaječar
20th-century pianists
21st-century pianists
University of Arts in Belgrade alumni
Year of birth missing (living people)
20th-century women pianists
21st-century women pianists